Ignatovo is a rural locality (a village) in Staroselskoye Rural Settlement, Vologodsky District, Vologda Oblast, Russia. The population was 15 as of 2002.

Geography 
Ignatovo is located 42 km west of Vologda (the district's administrative centre) by road. Striznevo is the nearest rural locality.

References 

Rural localities in Vologodsky District